Welling station may refer to:
Welling railway station in London, England
Welling Station, Alberta, Canada, a hamlet